Nightmare is a 2011 Chinese horror film directed by Yip Wai Ying.

Cast
 Zhou Xianxin as Fang Lei
 Victor Huang as Wang Quan
 Wu Jianfei as Zhou Feng 
 Gillian Chung as Angel 
 Kenny Kwan

References

Films directed by Yip Wai Ying
Chinese horror films
2011 horror films
2011 films
Films about nightmares